Vellanoweth (meaning new mill) is a hamlet near Ludgvan in Cornwall, England.

References

Hamlets in Cornwall